Camera Café is Spanish comedy TV series released in 2005 which was adapted from the French version Caméra Café. Elena Arnao was the casting director. It was directed by Luis Guridi from 2005 to 2009, who looked for new actors and screenwriters. It stars Arturo Valls, Carlos Chamarro, Carolina Cerezuela, Juana Cordero, Esperanza Pedreño and César Sarachu.

In June 2019 it was confirmed there will be a film named Camera Café: la película, which is set 10 years later with the same cast.

Cast

References

External links
 
 

Television sketch shows
2005 Spanish television series debuts
2009 Spanish television series endings
2000s Spanish comedy television series
Television shows set in Spain
Telecinco network series